Dreams Come True Charity is a UK children's charity. The charity fulfils the dreams of children and young adults with a wide range of medical conditions, covering a wide range of locations and ages.

The charity works with children and young people between the ages of 2 and 18 who have a serious or life limiting illness and helps them to fulfil their dreams.

Patrons

The list of Dreams Come True Patrons are: 
 Royal Patron Princess Michael of Kent, 
 Olivia Breen, Paralympian 
 Louise Damen, Athlete 
 Miranda Gore Browne, Celebrity Baker 
 Jo Pavey, Olympic Athlete 
 Jacqui Slack, Triathlete 
 Kirstie Steele, Actress 
 Christopher Timothy, Actor 
 Kane Tomlinson-Weaver, Actor

Felicity Wishes
In Dec 2013, Children's brand Felicity Wishes teamed up with Dreams Come True to help children across England get access to palliative care.

Felicity will become Dreams Come True's ambassador, running marathons, attending key events and granting dreams. Felicity Wishes will also be involved in Dreams Come True's annual Dream Tea campaign.

References

External links
Dreams Come True's website
Dreams Come True on Facebook
Dreams Come True on Twitter

Children's charities based in the United Kingdom